Give'n It was originally a demo released by the band Pepper in 2000. The demo was released on Cornerstone RAS. It was eventually reissued by the band's label LAW Records in 2003.

Track listing
 Unsafe Bridge 
 Feels Good  
 Regret Is
 Prank Caller
 Reverse
 No Reason
 Kelis Song
 Forever
 Your Way
 Do This
 Bad Idea
 Ho's (Live)
 Bonefire (Live)
 4 (Live)
 Splooge (Acoustic)
 D-425 (Acoustic)
 Loving Arms (Acoustic)
 Ho's (Acoustic)
 Sitting on the Curb (Acoustic)
(Tracks 1-11 are the original release as opposed to 12-19 that are only on the 2003 reissue)

Pepper (band) albums
2000 debut albums